Bettina Bunge was the defending champion but lost in the quarterfinals to Martina Navratilova.

Navratilova won in the final 6–3, 7–6 against Sylvia Hanika.

Seeds
A champion seed is indicated in bold text while text in italics indicates the round in which that seed was eliminated.

  Martina Navratilova (champion)
  Andrea Jaeger (first round)
  Tracy Austin (semifinals)
  Pam Shriver (quarterfinals)
  Barbara Potter (first round)
  Bettina Bunge (quarterfinals)
  Sylvia Hanika (final)
  Anne Smith (quarterfinals)

Draw

External links
 1983 Virginia Slims of Houston Draw

Virginia Slims of Houston
1983 Virginia Slims World Championship Series